Robert Trevors is a Canadian politician who was elected to the Legislative Assembly of New Brunswick in the 2010 provincial election. He represented the electoral district of Miramichi Centre as a member of the Progressive Conservatives until the 2014 election, when he was defeated by Bill Fraser in the redistributed riding of Miramichi.

References

Progressive Conservative Party of New Brunswick MLAs
Living people
Members of the Executive Council of New Brunswick
People from Miramichi, New Brunswick
21st-century Canadian politicians
Year of birth missing (living people)